Douglas S. McWhirter (13 August 1886 – 14 October 1966) was an English amateur footballer who competed at the 1912 Summer Olympics.

McWhirter, born in Erith, Kent, was part of the English team, which won the gold medal in the football tournament. He played one match.

References

External links
 

1886 births
1966 deaths
English footballers
England amateur international footballers
English people of Scottish descent
Footballers at the 1912 Summer Olympics
Olympic footballers of Great Britain
English Olympic medallists
Olympic gold medallists for Great Britain
Footballers from Erith
Olympic medalists in football
Medalists at the 1912 Summer Olympics
Association football midfielders